Avram Noam Chomsky (born December 7, 1928) is an American public intellectual: a linguist, philosopher, cognitive scientist, historian, social critic, and political activist. Sometimes called "the father of modern linguistics", Chomsky is also a major figure in analytic philosophy and one of the founders of the field of cognitive science. He is a Laureate Professor of Linguistics at the University of Arizona and an Institute Professor Emeritus at the Massachusetts Institute of Technology (MIT), and is the author of more than 150 books on topics such as linguistics, war, and politics. Ideologically, he aligns with anarcho-syndicalism and libertarian socialism.

Born to Ashkenazi Jewish immigrants in Philadelphia, Chomsky developed an early interest in anarchism from alternative bookstores in New York City. He studied at the University of Pennsylvania. During his postgraduate work in the Harvard Society of Fellows, Chomsky developed the theory of transformational grammar for which he earned his doctorate in 1955. That year he began teaching at MIT, and in 1957 emerged as a significant figure in linguistics with his landmark work Syntactic Structures, which played a major role in remodeling the study of language. From 1958 to 1959 Chomsky was a National Science Foundation fellow at the Institute for Advanced Study. He created or co-created the universal grammar theory, the generative grammar theory, the Chomsky hierarchy, and the minimalist program. Chomsky also played a pivotal role in the decline of linguistic behaviorism, and was particularly critical of the work of B. F. Skinner.

An outspoken opponent of U.S. involvement in the Vietnam War, which he saw as an act of American imperialism, in 1967 Chomsky rose to national attention for his anti-war essay "The Responsibility of Intellectuals". Becoming associated with the New Left, he was arrested multiple times for his activism and placed on President Richard Nixon's list of political opponents. While expanding his work in linguistics over subsequent decades, he also became involved in the linguistics wars. In collaboration with Edward S. Herman, Chomsky later articulated the propaganda model of media criticism in Manufacturing Consent, and worked to expose the Indonesian occupation of East Timor. His defense of unconditional freedom of speech, including that of Holocaust denial, generated significant controversy in the Faurisson affair of the 1980s. Since retiring from active teaching at MIT, he has continued his vocal political activism, including opposing the 2003 invasion of Iraq and supporting the Occupy movement. Chomsky began teaching at the University of Arizona in 2017.

One of the most cited scholars alive, Chomsky has influenced a broad array of academic fields. He is widely recognized as having helped to spark the cognitive revolution in the human sciences, contributing to the development of a new cognitivistic framework for the study of language and the mind. In addition to his continued scholarship, he remains a leading critic of U.S. foreign policy, contemporary state capitalism, U.S. involvement and Israel's role in the Israeli–Palestinian conflict, and mass media. Chomsky and his ideas are highly influential in the anti-capitalist and anti-imperialist movements.

Life

Childhood: 1928–1945
Avram Noam Chomsky was born on December 7, 1928, in the East Oak Lane neighborhood of Philadelphia, Pennsylvania. His parents, Ze'ev "William" Chomsky and Elsie Simonofsky, were Jewish immigrants. William had fled the Russian Empire in 1913 to escape conscription and worked in Baltimore sweatshops and Hebrew elementary schools before attending university. After moving to Philadelphia, William became principal of the Congregation Mikveh Israel religious school and joined the Gratz College faculty. He placed great emphasis on educating people so that they would be "well integrated, free and independent in their thinking, concerned about improving and enhancing the world, and eager to participate in making life more meaningful and worthwhile for all", a mission that shaped and was subsequently adopted by his son. Elsie was a teacher and activist born in Belarus. They met at Mikveh Israel, where they both worked.

Noam (born 1928) was the Chomskys' first child. His younger brother, David Eli Chomsky (1934–2021), was born five years later, and worked as a cardiologist in Philadelphia. The brothers were close, though David was more easygoing while Noam could be very competitive. Chomsky and his brother were raised Jewish, being taught Hebrew and regularly involved with discussing the political theories of Zionism; the family was particularly influenced by the Left Zionist writings of Ahad Ha'am. Chomsky faced antisemitism as a child, particularly from Philadelphia's Irish and German communities.

Chomsky attended the independent, Deweyite Oak Lane Country Day School and Philadelphia's Central High School, where he excelled academically and joined various clubs and societies, but was troubled by the school's hierarchical and regimented teaching methods. He also attended Hebrew High School at Gratz College, where his father taught.

Chomsky has described his parents as "normal Roosevelt Democrats" with center-left politics, but relatives involved in the International Ladies' Garment Workers' Union exposed him to socialism and far-left politics. He was substantially influenced by his uncle and the Jewish leftists who frequented his New York City newspaper stand to debate current affairs. Chomsky himself often visited left-wing and anarchist bookstores when visiting his uncle in the city, voraciously reading political literature. He wrote his first article at age 10 on the spread of fascism following the fall of Barcelona (Feb. 1939) during the Spanish Civil War and, from the age of 12 or 13, identified with anarchist politics, as well as the "anti-Bolshevik Left." He later described his discovery of anarchism as "a lucky accident" that made him critical of Stalinism and other forms of Marxism–Leninism.

University: 1945–1955

In 1945, aged 16, Chomsky began a general program of study at the University of Pennsylvania, where he explored philosophy, logic, and languages and developed a primary interest in learning Arabic. Living at home, he funded his undergraduate degree by teaching Hebrew. Frustrated with his experiences at the university, he considered dropping out and moving to a kibbutz in Mandatory Palestine, but his intellectual curiosity was reawakened through conversations with the Russian-born linguist Zellig Harris, whom he first met in a political circle in 1947. Harris introduced Chomsky to the field of theoretical linguistics and convinced him to major in the subject. Chomsky's BA honors thesis, "Morphophonemics of Modern Hebrew", applied Harris's methods to the language. Chomsky revised this thesis for his MA, which he received from the University of Pennsylvania in 1951; it was subsequently published as a book. He also developed his interest in philosophy while at university, in particular under the tutelage of Nelson Goodman.

From 1951 to 1955 Chomsky was a member of the Society of Fellows at Harvard University, where he undertook research on what became his doctoral dissertation. Having been encouraged by Goodman to apply, Chomsky was attracted to Harvard in part because the philosopher Willard Van Orman Quine was based there. Both Quine and a visiting philosopher, J. L. Austin of the University of Oxford, strongly influenced Chomsky. In 1952 Chomsky published his first academic article, Systems of Syntactic Analysis, which appeared not in a journal of linguistics but in The Journal of Symbolic Logic. Highly critical of the established behaviorist currents in linguistics, in 1954 he presented his ideas at lectures at the University of Chicago and Yale University. He had not been registered as a student at Pennsylvania for four years, but in 1955 he submitted a thesis setting out his ideas on transformational grammar; he was awarded a Doctor of Philosophy degree for it, and it was privately distributed among specialists on microfilm before being published in 1975 as part of The Logical Structure of Linguistic Theory. Harvard professor George Armitage Miller was impressed by Chomsky's thesis and collaborated with him on several technical papers in mathematical linguistics. Chomsky's doctorate exempted him from compulsory military service, which was otherwise due to begin in 1955.

In 1947 Chomsky began a romantic relationship with Carol Doris Schatz, whom he had known since early childhood. They married in 1949. After Chomsky was made a Fellow at Harvard, the couple moved to the Allston area of Boston and remained there until 1965, when they relocated to the suburb of Lexington. In 1953 the couple took a Harvard travel grant to Europe, from the United Kingdom through France, Switzerland into Italy, and Israel, where they lived in Hashomer Hatzair's HaZore'a kibbutz. Despite enjoying himself, Chomsky was appalled by the country's Jewish nationalism, anti-Arab racism and, within the kibbutz's leftist community, pro-Stalinism.
On visits to New York City, Chomsky continued to frequent the office of the Yiddish anarchist journal Fraye Arbeter Shtime and became enamored with the ideas of Rudolf Rocker, a contributor whose work introduced Chomsky to the link between anarchism and classical liberalism. Chomsky also read other political thinkers: the anarchists Mikhail Bakunin and Diego Abad de Santillán, democratic socialists George Orwell, Bertrand Russell, and Dwight Macdonald, and works by Marxists Karl Liebknecht, Karl Korsch, and Rosa Luxemburg. His readings convinced him of the desirability of an anarcho-syndicalist society, and he became fascinated by the anarcho-syndicalist communes set up during the Spanish Civil War, as documented in Orwell's Homage to Catalonia (1938). He read the leftist journal Politics, which furthered his interest in anarchism, and the council communist periodical Living Marxism, though he rejected the orthodoxy of its editor, Paul Mattick.

Early career: 1955–1966
Chomsky befriended two linguists at the Massachusetts Institute of Technology (MIT), Morris Halle and Roman Jakobson, the latter of whom secured him an assistant professor position there in 1955. At MIT, Chomsky spent half his time on a mechanical translation project and half teaching a course on linguistics and philosophy. He described MIT as "a pretty free and open place, open to experimentation and without rigid requirements. It was just perfect for someone of my idiosyncratic interests and work." In 1957 MIT promoted him to the position of associate professor, and from 1957 to 1958 he was also employed by Columbia University as a visiting professor. The Chomskys had their first child that same year, a daughter named Aviva. He also published his first book on linguistics, Syntactic Structures, a work that radically opposed the dominant Harris–Bloomfield trend in the field. Responses to Chomsky's ideas ranged from indifference to hostility, and his work proved divisive and caused "significant upheaval" in the discipline. The linguist John Lyons later asserted that Syntactic Structures "revolutionized the scientific study of language". From 1958 to 1959 Chomsky was a National Science Foundation fellow at the Institute for Advanced Study in Princeton, New Jersey.

In 1959, Chomsky published a review of B. F. Skinner's 1957 book Verbal Behavior in the academic journal Language, in which he argued against Skinner's view of language as learned behavior. The review argued that Skinner ignored the role of human creativity in linguistics and helped to establish Chomsky as an intellectual. With Halle, Chomsky proceeded to found MIT's graduate program in linguistics. In 1961 he was awarded tenure, becoming a full professor in the Department of Modern Languages and Linguistics. Chomsky went on to be appointed plenary speaker at the Ninth International Congress of Linguists, held in 1962 in Cambridge, Massachusetts, which established him as the de facto spokesperson of American linguistics. Between 1963 and 1965 he consulted on a military-sponsored project "to establish natural language as an operational language for command and control"; Barbara Partee, a collaborator on this project and then-student of Chomsky, has said this research was justified to the military on the basis that "in the event of a nuclear war, the generals would be underground with some computers trying to manage things, and that it would probably be easier to teach computers to understand English than to teach the generals to program."

Chomsky continued to publish his linguistic ideas throughout the decade, including in Aspects of the Theory of Syntax (1965), Topics in the Theory of Generative Grammar (1966), and Cartesian Linguistics: A Chapter in the History of Rationalist Thought (1966). Along with Halle, he also edited the Studies in Language series of books for Harper and Row. As he began to accrue significant academic recognition and honors for his work, Chomsky lectured at the University of California, Berkeley, in 1966. His Beckman lectures at Berkeley were assembled and published as Language and Mind in 1968. Despite his growing stature, an intellectual falling-out between Chomsky and some of his early colleagues and doctoral students—including Paul Postal, John "Haj" Ross, George Lakoff, and James D. McCawley—triggered a series of academic debates that came to be known as the "Linguistics Wars", although they revolved largely around philosophical issues rather than linguistics proper.

Anti-war activism and dissent: 1967–1975

Chomsky joined protests against U.S. involvement in the Vietnam War in 1962, speaking on the subject at small gatherings in churches and homes. His 1967 critique of U.S. involvement, "The Responsibility of Intellectuals", among other contributions to The New York Review of Books, debuted Chomsky as a public dissident. This essay and other political articles were collected and published in 1969 as part of Chomsky's first political book, American Power and the New Mandarins. He followed this with further political books, including At War with Asia (1970), The Backroom Boys (1973), For Reasons of State (1973), and Peace in the Middle East? (1974), published by Pantheon Books. These publications led to Chomsky's association with the American New Left movement, though he thought little of prominent New Left intellectuals Herbert Marcuse and Erich Fromm and preferred the company of activists to that of intellectuals. Chomsky remained largely ignored by the mainstream press throughout this period.

He also became involved in left-wing activism. Chomsky refused to pay half his taxes, publicly supported students who refused the draft, and was arrested while participating an anti-war teach-in outside the Pentagon. During this time, Chomsky co-founded the anti-war collective RESIST with Mitchell Goodman, Denise Levertov, William Sloane Coffin, and Dwight Macdonald. Although he questioned the objectives of the 1968 student protests, Chomsky gave many lectures to student activist groups and, with his colleague Louis Kampf, ran undergraduate courses on politics at MIT independently of the conservative-dominated political science department. When student activists campaigned to stop weapons and counterinsurgency research at MIT, Chomsky was sympathetic but felt that the research should remain under MIT's oversight and limited to systems of deterrence and defense. Chomsky has acknowledged that his MIT lab's funding at this time came from the military. He later said he considered resigning from MIT during the Vietnam War. There has since been a wide-ranging debate about what effects Chomsky's employment at MIT had on his political and linguistic ideas.

Because of his anti-war activism, Chomsky was arrested on multiple occasions and included on President Richard Nixon's master list of political opponents. Chomsky was aware of the potential repercussions of his civil disobedience, and his wife began studying for her own doctorate in linguistics to support the family in the event of Chomsky's imprisonment or joblessness. Chomsky's scientific reputation insulated him from administrative action based on his beliefs. In 1970 he visited southeast Asia to lecture at Vietnam's Hanoi University of Science and Technology and toured war refugee camps in Laos. In 1973 he helped lead a committee commemorating the 50th anniversary of the War Resisters League.

His work in linguistics continued to gain international recognition as he received multiple honorary doctorates. He delivered public lectures at the University of Cambridge, Columbia University (Woodbridge Lectures), and Stanford University. His appearance in a 1971 debate with French continental philosopher Michel Foucault positioned Chomsky as a symbolic figurehead of analytic philosophy. He continued to publish extensively on linguistics, producing Studies on Semantics in Generative Grammar (1972), an enlarged edition of Language and Mind (1972), and Reflections on Language (1975). In 1974 Chomsky became a corresponding fellow of the British Academy.

Edward S. Herman and the Faurisson affair: 1976–1980

In the late 1970s and 1980s, Chomsky's linguistic publications expanded and clarified his earlier work, addressing his critics and updating his grammatical theory. His political talks often generated considerable controversy, particularly when he criticized the Israeli government and military. In the early 1970s Chomsky began collaborating with Edward S. Herman, who had also published critiques of the U.S. war in Vietnam. Together they wrote Counter-Revolutionary Violence: Bloodbaths in Fact & Propaganda, a book that criticized U.S. military involvement in Southeast Asia and the mainstream media's failure to cover it. Warner Modular published it in 1973, but its parent company disapproved of the book's contents and ordered all copies destroyed.

While mainstream publishing options proved elusive, Chomsky found support from Michael Albert's South End Press, an activist-oriented publishing company. In 1979, South End published Chomsky and Herman's revised Counter-Revolutionary Violence as the two-volume The Political Economy of Human Rights, which compares U.S. media reactions to the Cambodian genocide and the Indonesian occupation of East Timor. It argues that because Indonesia was a U.S. ally, U.S. media ignored the East Timorese situation while focusing on events in Cambodia, a U.S. enemy. Chomsky's response included two testimonials before the United Nations' Special Committee on Decolonization, successful encouragement for American media to cover the occupation, and meetings with refugees in Lisbon. The Marxist academic Steven Lukes publicly accused Chomsky of betraying his anarchist ideals and acting as an apologist for Cambodian leader Pol Pot. Herman said that the controversy "imposed a serious personal cost" on Chomsky, Chomsky said that "conformist intellectuals of East or West" deal with dissident opinion by trying "to overwhelm it with a flood of lies". He regarded the personal criticism as less important than the evidence that "mainstream intelligentsia suppressed or justified the crimes of their own states".

Chomsky had long publicly criticized Nazism, and totalitarianism more generally, but his commitment to freedom of speech led him to defend the right of French historian Robert Faurisson to advocate a position widely characterized as Holocaust denial. Without Chomsky's knowledge, his plea for Faurisson's freedom of speech was published as the preface to the latter's 1980 book . Chomsky was widely condemned for defending Faurisson, and France's mainstream press accused Chomsky of being a Holocaust denier himself, refusing to publish his rebuttals to their accusations. Critiquing Chomsky's position, sociologist Werner Cohn later published an analysis of the affair titled Partners in Hate: Noam Chomsky and the Holocaust Deniers. The Faurisson affair had a lasting, damaging effect on Chomsky's career, especially in France.

Critique of propaganda and international affairs: 1980–2001

In 1985, during the Nicaraguan Contra War—in which the U.S. supported the contra militia against the Sandinista government—Chomsky traveled to Managua to meet with workers' organizations and refugees of the conflict, giving public lectures on politics and linguistics. Many of these lectures were published in 1987 as On Power and Ideology: The Managua Lectures. In 1983 he published The Fateful Triangle, which argued that the U.S. had continually used the Israeli–Palestinian conflict for its own ends. In 1988, Chomsky visited the Palestinian territories to witness the impact of Israeli occupation.

Chomsky and Herman's Manufacturing Consent: The Political Economy of the Mass Media (1988) outlines their propaganda model for understanding mainstream media. Even in countries without official censorship, they argued, the news is censored through five filters that greatly influence both what and how news is presented. The book was inspired by Alex Carey and adapted into a 1992 film. In 1989, Chomsky published Necessary Illusions: Thought Control in Democratic Societies, in which he suggests that a worthwhile democracy requires that its citizens undertake intellectual self-defense against the media and elite intellectual culture that seeks to control them. By the 1980s, Chomsky's students had become prominent linguists who, in turn, expanded and revised his linguistic theories.

In the 1990s, Chomsky embraced political activism to a greater degree than before. Retaining his commitment to the cause of East Timorese independence, in 1995 he visited Australia to talk on the issue at the behest of the East Timorese Relief Association and the National Council for East Timorese Resistance. The lectures he gave on the subject were published as Powers and Prospects in 1996. As a result of the international publicity Chomsky generated, his biographer Wolfgang Sperlich opined that he did more to aid the cause of East Timorese independence than anyone but the investigative journalist John Pilger. After East Timor attained independence from Indonesia in 1999, the Australian-led International Force for East Timor arrived as a peacekeeping force; Chomsky was critical of this, believing it was designed to secure Australian access to East Timor's oil and gas reserves under the Timor Gap Treaty.

Iraq war criticism and retirement from MIT: 2001–2017

Chomsky was widely interviewed after the September 11 attacks in 2001 as the American public attempted to make sense of the attacks. He argued that the ensuing War on Terror was not a new development but a continuation of U.S. foreign policy and concomitant rhetoric since at least the Reagan era. He gave the D.T. Lakdawala Memorial Lecture in New Delhi in 2001, and in 2003 visited Cuba at the invitation of the Latin American Association of Social Scientists. Chomsky's 2003 Hegemony or Survival articulated what he called the United States' "imperial grand strategy" and critiqued the Iraq War and other aspects of the War on Terror. Chomsky toured internationally with greater regularity during this period.

Chomsky retired from MIT in 2002, but continued to conduct research and seminars on campus as an emeritus. That same year he visited Turkey to attend the trial of a publisher who had been accused of treason for printing one of Chomsky's books; Chomsky insisted on being a co-defendant and amid international media attention, the Security Courts dropped the charge on the first day. During that trip Chomsky visited Kurdish areas of Turkey and spoke out in favor of the Kurds' human rights. A supporter of the World Social Forum, he attended its conferences in Brazil in both 2002 and 2003, also attending the Forum event in India.

Chomsky supported the 2011 Occupy movement. He spoke at encampments and produced two works that chronicled its influence: Occupy (2012), a pamphlet, and Occupy: Reflections on Class War, Rebellion and Solidarity (2013). He attributed Occupy's growth to a perception that the Democratic Party had abandoned the interests of the white working class. In March 2014, Chomsky joined the advisory council of the Nuclear Age Peace Foundation, an organization that advocates the global abolition of nuclear weapons, as a senior fellow. The 2015 documentary Requiem for the American Dream summarizes his views on capitalism and economic inequality through a "75-minute teach-in".

University of Arizona: 2017–present
In 2017, Chomsky taught a short-term politics course at the University of Arizona in Tucson and was later hired as a part-time professor in the linguistics department there, with his duties including teaching and public seminars. His salary is covered by philanthropic donations.

Chomsky signed the Declaration on the Common Language of the Croats, Serbs, Bosniaks and Montenegrins in 2018.

In March 2022, Chomsky called the Russian invasion of Ukraine a "major war crime", ranking alongside the U.S.-led invasion of Iraq and the German–Soviet invasion of Poland in 1939, adding, "It always makes sense to seek explanations, but there is no justification, no extenuation." In October 2022, he called on the U.S. to stop "undermining negotiations" between Ukraine and Russia.

Linguistic theory

The basis of Chomsky's linguistic theory lies in biolinguistics, the linguistic school that holds that the principles underpinning the structure of language are biologically preset in the human mind and hence genetically inherited. He argues that all humans share the same underlying linguistic structure, irrespective of sociocultural differences. In adopting this position Chomsky rejects the radical behaviorist psychology of B. F. Skinner, who viewed behavior (including talking and thinking) as a completely learned product of the interactions between organisms and their environments. Accordingly, Chomsky argues that language is a unique evolutionary development of the human species and distinguished from modes of communication used by any other animal species. Chomsky's nativist, internalist view of language is consistent with the philosophical school of "rationalism" and contrasts with the anti-nativist, externalist view of language consistent with the philosophical school of "empiricism", which contends that all knowledge, including language, comes from external stimuli.

Universal grammar

Since the 1960s Chomsky has maintained that syntactic knowledge is at least partially inborn, implying that children need only learn certain language-specific features of their native languages. He bases his argument on observations about human language acquisition and describes a "poverty of the stimulus": an enormous gap between the linguistic stimuli to which children are exposed and the rich linguistic competence they attain. For example, although children are exposed to only a very small and finite subset of the allowable syntactic variants within their first language, they somehow acquire the highly organized and systematic ability to understand and produce an infinite number of sentences, including ones that have never before been uttered, in that language. To explain this, Chomsky reasoned that the primary linguistic data must be supplemented by an innate linguistic capacity. Furthermore, while a human baby and a kitten are both capable of inductive reasoning, if they are exposed to exactly the same linguistic data, the human will always acquire the ability to understand and produce language, while the kitten will never acquire either ability. Chomsky referred to this difference in capacity as the language acquisition device, and suggested that linguists needed to determine both what that device is and what constraints it imposes on the range of possible human languages. The universal features that result from these constraints would constitute "universal grammar". Multiple scholars have challenged universal grammar on the grounds of the evolutionary infeasibility of its genetic basis for language, the lack of universal characteristics between languages, and the unproven link between innate/universal structures and the structures of specific languages. Scholar Michael Tomasello has challenged Chomsky's theory of innate syntactic knowledge as based on theory and not behavioral observation. Although it was influential from 1960s through 1990s, Chomsky's nativist theory was ultimately rejected by the mainstream child language acquisition research community owing to its inconsistency with research evidence. It was also argued by linguists including Robert Freidin, Geoffrey Sampson, Geoffrey K. Pullum and Barbara Scholz that Chomsky's linguistic evidence for it had been false.

Transformational-generative grammar

Transformational-generative grammar is a broad theory used to model, encode, and deduce a native speaker's linguistic capabilities. These models, or "formal grammars", show the abstract structures of a specific language as they may relate to structures in other languages. Chomsky developed transformational grammar in the mid-1950s, whereupon it became the dominant syntactic theory in linguistics for two decades. "Transformations" refers to syntactic relationships within language, e.g., being able to infer that the subject between two sentences is the same person. Chomsky's theory posits that language consists of both deep structures and surface structures: Outward-facing surface structures relate phonetic rules into sound, while inward-facing deep structures relate words and conceptual meaning. Transformational-generative grammar uses mathematical notation to express the rules that govern the connection between meaning and sound (deep and surface structures, respectively). By this theory, linguistic principles can mathematically generate potential sentence structures in a language.

It is a common conception that Chomsky invented transformational-generative grammar, but his actual contribution to it was considered modest at the time when Chomsky first published his theory. In his 1955 dissertation and his 1957 textbook Syntactic Structures, he presented recent developments in the analysis formulated by Zellig Harris, who was Chomsky's PhD supervisor, and by Charles F. Hockett. Their method is derived from the work of the Danish structural linguist Louis Hjelmslev, who introduced algorithmic grammar to general linguistics. Based on this rule-based notation of grammars,  Chomsky grouped logically possible phrase-structure grammar types into a series of four nested subsets and increasingly complex types, together known as the Chomsky hierarchy. This classification remains relevant to formal language theory and theoretical computer science, especially programming language theory, compiler construction, and automata theory.

Following transformational grammar's heyday through the mid-1970s, a derivative government and binding theory became a dominant research framework through the early 1990s,  remaining an influential theory, when linguists turned to a "minimalist" approach to grammar. This research focused on the principles and parameters framework, which explained children's ability to learn any language by filling open parameters (a set of universal grammar principles) that adapt as the child encounters linguistic data. The minimalist program, initiated by Chomsky, asks which minimal principles and parameters theory fits most elegantly, naturally, and simply. In an attempt to simplify language into a system that relates meaning and sound using the minimum possible faculties, Chomsky dispenses with concepts such as "deep structure" and "surface structure" and instead emphasizes the plasticity of the brain's neural circuits, with which come an infinite number of concepts, or "logical forms". When exposed to linguistic data, a hearer-speaker's brain proceeds to associate sound and meaning, and the rules of grammar we observe are in fact only the consequences, or side effects, of the way language works. Thus, while much of Chomsky's prior research focused on the rules of language, he now focuses on the mechanisms the brain uses to generate these rules and regulate speech.

Political views

Chomsky is a prominent political dissident. His political views have changed little since his childhood, when he was influenced by the emphasis on political activism that was ingrained in Jewish working-class tradition. He usually identifies as an anarcho-syndicalist or a libertarian socialist. He views these positions not as precise political theories but as ideals that he thinks best meet human needs: liberty, community, and freedom of association. Unlike some other socialists, such as Marxists, Chomsky believes that politics lies outside the remit of science, but he still roots his ideas about an ideal society in empirical data and empirically justified theories.

In Chomsky's view, the truth about political realities is systematically distorted or suppressed by an elite corporatocracy, which uses corporate media, advertising, and think tanks to promote its own propaganda. His work seeks to reveal such manipulations and the truth they obscure. Chomsky believes this web of falsehood can be broken by "common sense", critical thinking, and understanding the roles of self-interest and self-deception, and that intellectuals abdicate their moral responsibility to tell the truth about the world in fear of losing prestige and funding. He argues that, as such an intellectual, it is his duty to use his social privilege, resources, and training to aid popular democracy movements in their struggles.

Although he has joined protest marches and organized activist groups, Chomsky's primary political outlets are education and publication. He offers a wide range of political writings as well as free lessons and lectures to encourage wider political consciousness. He is a longtime member of the Industrial Workers of the World international union, as was his father.

United States foreign policy

Chomsky has been a prominent critic of American imperialism and believes that World War II is the only justified war the U.S. has fought in his lifetime. He believes that the basic principle of the foreign policy of the United States is the establishment of "open societies" that are economically and politically controlled by the United States and where U.S.-based businesses can prosper. He argues that the U.S. seeks to suppress any movements within these countries that are not compliant with U.S. interests and to ensure that U.S.-friendly governments are placed in power. When discussing current events, he emphasizes their place within a wider historical perspective. He believes that official, sanctioned historical accounts of U.S. and British extraterritorial operations have consistently whitewashed these nations' actions in order to present them as having benevolent motives in either spreading democracy or, in older instances, spreading Christianity; criticizing these accounts, he seeks to correct them. Prominent examples he regularly cites are the actions of the British Empire in India and Africa and the actions of the U.S. in Vietnam, the Philippines, Latin America, and the Middle East.

Chomsky's political work has centered heavily on criticizing the actions of the United States. He has said he focuses on the U.S. because the country has militarily and economically dominated the world during his lifetime and because its liberal democratic electoral system allows the citizenry to influence government policy. His hope is that, by spreading awareness of the impact U.S. foreign policies have on the populations affected by them, he can sway the populations of the U.S. and other countries into opposing the policies. He urges people to criticize their governments' motivations, decisions, and actions, to accept responsibility for their own thoughts and actions, and to apply the same standards to others as to themselves.

Chomsky has been critical of U.S. involvement in the Israeli–Palestinian conflict, arguing that it has consistently blocked a peaceful settlement. Chomsky also criticizes the U.S.'s close ties with Saudi Arabia and involvement in Saudi Arabian-led intervention in Yemen, highlighting that Saudi Arabia has "one of the most grotesque human rights records in the world".

Capitalism and socialism
In his youth, Chomsky developed a dislike of capitalism and the pursuit of material wealth. At the same time, he developed a disdain for authoritarian socialism, as represented by the Marxist–Leninist policies of the Soviet Union. Rather than accepting the common view among U.S. economists that a spectrum exists between total state ownership of the economy and total private ownership, he instead suggests that a spectrum should be understood between total democratic control of the economy and total autocratic control (whether state or private). He argues that Western capitalist countries are not really democratic, because, in his view, a truly democratic society is one in which all persons have a say in public economic policy. He has stated his opposition to ruling elites, among them institutions like the IMF, World Bank, and GATT (precursor to the WTO).

Chomsky highlights that, since the 1970s, the U.S. has become increasingly economically unequal as a result of the repeal of various financial regulations and the unilateral rescinding of the Bretton Woods financial control agreement by the U.S. He characterizes the U.S. as a de facto one-party state, viewing both the Republican Party and Democratic Party as manifestations of a single "Business Party" controlled by corporate and financial interests. Chomsky highlights that, within Western capitalist liberal democracies, at least 80% of the population has no control over economic decisions, which are instead in the hands of a management class and ultimately controlled by a small, wealthy elite.

Noting the entrenchment of such an economic system, Chomsky believes that change is possible through the organized cooperation of large numbers of people who understand the problem and know how they want to reorganize the economy more equitably. Acknowledging that corporate domination of media and government stifles any significant change to this system, he sees reason for optimism in historical examples such as the social rejection of slavery as immoral, the advances in women's rights, and the forcing of government to justify invasions. He views violent revolution to overthrow a government as a last resort to be avoided if possible, citing the example of historical revolutions where the population's welfare has worsened as a result of upheaval.

Chomsky sees libertarian socialist and anarcho-syndicalist ideas as the descendants of the classical liberal ideas of the Age of Enlightenment, arguing that his ideological position revolves around "nourishing the libertarian and creative character of the human being". He envisions an anarcho-syndicalist future with direct worker control of the means of production and government by workers' councils, who would select temporary and revocable representatives to meet together at general assemblies. The point of this self-governance is to make each citizen, in Thomas Jefferson's words, "a direct participator in the government of affairs." He believes that there will be no need for political parties. By controlling their productive life, he believes that individuals can gain job satisfaction and a sense of fulfillment and purpose. He argues that unpleasant and unpopular jobs could be fully automated, carried out by workers who are specially remunerated, or shared among everyone.

Israeli–Palestinian conflict

Chomsky has written prolifically on the Israeli–Palestinian conflict, aiming to raise public awareness of it. He has long endorsed a left binationalist program in Israel and Palestine, seeking to create a democratic state in the Levant that is home to both Jews and Arabs. He has called the adoption of the 1947 United Nations Partition Plan for Palestine "a very bad decision." Nevertheless, given the realpolitik of the situation, he has also considered a two-state solution on the condition that the nation-states exist on equal terms. Chomsky was denied entry to the West Bank in 2010 because of his criticisms of Israel. He had been invited to deliver a lecture at Bir Zeit University and was to meet with Palestinian Prime Minister Salam Fayyad. An Israeli Foreign Ministry spokesman later said that Chomsky was denied entry by mistake.

Mass media and propaganda

Chomsky's political writings have largely focused on ideology, social and political power, mass media, and state policy. One of his best-known works, Manufacturing Consent, dissects the media's role in reinforcing and acquiescing to state policies across the political spectrum while marginalizing contrary perspectives. Chomsky asserts that this version of censorship, by government-guided "free market" forces, is subtler and harder to undermine than was the equivalent propaganda system in the Soviet Union. As he argues, the mainstream press is corporate-owned and thus reflects corporate priorities and interests. Acknowledging that many American journalists are dedicated and well-meaning, he argues that the mass media's choices of topics and issues, the unquestioned premises on which that coverage rests, and the range of opinions expressed are all constrained to reinforce the state's ideology: although mass media will criticize individual politicians and political parties, it will not undermine the wider state-corporate nexus of which it is a part. As evidence, he highlights that the U.S. mass media does not employ any socialist journalists or political commentators. He also points to examples of important news stories that the U.S. mainstream media has ignored because reporting on them would reflect badly upon the country, including the murder of Black Panther Fred Hampton with possible FBI involvement, the massacres in Nicaragua perpetrated by U.S.-funded Contras, and the constant reporting on Israeli deaths without equivalent coverage of the far larger number of Palestinian deaths in that conflict. To remedy this situation, Chomsky calls for grassroots democratic control and involvement of the media.

Chomsky considers most conspiracy theories fruitless, distracting substitutes for thinking about policy formation in an institutional framework, where individual manipulation is secondary to broader social imperatives. While not dismissing them outright, he considers them unproductive to challenging power in a substantial way. In response to the labeling of his own ideas as a conspiracy theory, Chomsky has said that it is very rational for the media to manipulate information in order to sell it, like any other business. He asks whether General Motors would be accused of conspiracy if it deliberately selected what it used or discarded to sell its product. Instead of supporting the educational system as an antidote, he believes that most education is counterproductive. Chomsky describes mass education as a system solely intended to turn farmers from independent producers into unthinking industrial employees.

Philosophy
Chomsky has also been active in a number of philosophical fields, including philosophy of mind, philosophy of language, and philosophy of science. In these fields he is credited with ushering in the "cognitive revolution", a significant paradigm shift that rejected logical positivism, the prevailing philosophical methodology of the time, and reframed how philosophers think about language and the mind. Chomsky views the cognitive revolution as rooted in 17th-century rationalist ideals. His position—the idea that the mind contains inherent structures to understand language, perception, and thought—has more in common with rationalism (Enlightenment and Cartesian) than behaviorism. He named one of his key works Cartesian Linguistics: A Chapter in the History of Rationalist Thought (1966). This sparked criticism from historians and philosophers who disagreed with Chomsky's interpretations of classical sources and use of philosophical terminology. In the philosophy of language, Chomsky is particularly known for his criticisms of the notion of reference and meaning in human language and his perspective on the nature and function of mental representations.

Chomsky's famous 1971 debate on human nature with the French philosopher Michel Foucault was symbolic in positioning Chomsky as the prototypical analytic philosopher against Foucault, a stalwart of the continental tradition. It showed what appeared to be irreconcilable differences between two moral and intellectual luminaries of the 20th century. Foucault's position was that of critique, that human nature could not be conceived in terms foreign to present understanding, while Chomsky held that human nature contained universalities such as a common standard of moral justice as deduced through reason based on what rationally serves human necessity. Chomsky criticized postmodernism and French philosophy generally, arguing that the obscure language of postmodern, leftist philosophers gives little aid to the working classes. He has also debated analytic philosophers, including Tyler Burge, Donald Davidson, Michael Dummett, Saul Kripke, Thomas Nagel, Hilary Putnam, Willard Van Orman Quine, and John Searle.

Chomsky's contributions span intellectual and world history, including the history of philosophy. Irony is a recurring characteristic of his writing, as he often implies that his readers know better, which can make them more engaged in the veracity of his claims.

Personal life

Chomsky endeavors to separate his family life, linguistic scholarship, and political activism from each other. An intensely private person, he is uninterested in appearances and the fame his work has brought him. He also has little interest in modern art and music. McGilvray suggests that Chomsky was never motivated by a desire for fame, but impelled to tell what he perceived as the truth and a desire to aid others in doing so. Chomsky acknowledges that his income affords him a privileged life compared to the majority of the world's population; nevertheless, he characterizes himself as a "worker", albeit one who uses his intellect as his employable skill. He reads four or five newspapers daily; in the US, he subscribes to The Boston Globe, The New York Times, The Wall Street Journal, Financial Times, and The Christian Science Monitor. Chomsky is non-religious, but has expressed approval of forms of religion such as liberation theology.

Chomsky is known to use charged language ("corrupt", "fascist", "fraudulent") when describing established political and academic figures, which can polarize his audience but is in keeping with his belief that much scholarship is self-serving. His colleague Steven Pinker has said that he "portrays people who disagree with him as stupid or evil, using withering scorn in his rhetoric", and that this contributes to the extreme reactions he receives . Chomsky avoids attending academic conferences, including left-oriented ones such as the Socialist Scholars Conference, preferring to speak to activist groups or hold university seminars for mass audiences. His approach to academic freedom has led him to support MIT academics whose actions he deplores; in 1969, when Chomsky heard that Walt Rostow, a major architect of the Vietnam war, wanted to return to work at MIT, Chomsky threatened "to protest publicly" if Rostow were denied a position at MIT. In 1989, when Pentagon adviser John Deutch applied to be president of MIT, Chomsky supported his candidacy. Later, when Deutch became head of the CIA, The New York Times quoted Chomsky as saying, "He has more honesty and integrity than anyone I've ever met.... If somebody's got to be running the CIA, I'm glad it's him."

Chomsky was married to Carol from 1949 until her death in 2008. They had three children together: Aviva (born 1957), Diane (born 1960), and Harry (born 1967). In 2014, Chomsky married Valeria Wasserman.

Reception and influence

Chomsky has been a defining Western intellectual figure, central to the field of linguistics and definitive in cognitive science, computer science, philosophy, and psychology. In addition to being known as one of the most important intellectuals of his time, Chomsky has a dual legacy as a leader and luminary in both linguistics and the realm of political dissent. Despite his academic success, his political viewpoints and activism have resulted in his being distrusted by mainstream media, and he is regarded as being "on the outer margin of acceptability". Chomsky's public image and social reputation often color his work's public reception.

In academia
McGilvray observes that Chomsky inaugurated the "cognitive revolution" in linguistics, and that he is largely responsible for establishing the field as a formal, natural science, moving it away from the procedural form of structural linguistics dominant during the mid-20th century. As such, some have called Chomsky "the father of modern linguistics". Linguist John Lyons further remarked that within a few decades of publication, Chomskyan linguistics had become "the most dynamic and influential" school of thought in the field. By the 1970s his work had also come to exert a considerable influence on philosophy, and a Minnesota State University Moorhead poll ranked Syntactic Structures as the single most important work in cognitive science. In addition, his work in automata theory and the Chomsky hierarchy have become well known in computer science, and he is much cited in computational linguistics.

Chomsky's criticisms of behaviorism contributed substantially to the decline of behaviorist psychology; in addition, he is generally regarded as one of the primary founders of the field of cognitive science. Some arguments in evolutionary psychology are derived from his research results; Nim Chimpsky, a chimpanzee who was the subject of a study in animal language acquisition at Columbia University, was named after Chomsky in reference to his view of language acquisition as a uniquely human ability.

ACM Turing Award winner Donald Knuth credited Chomsky's work with helping him combine his interests in mathematics, linguistics, and computer science. IBM computer scientist John Backus, another Turing Award winner, used some of Chomsky's concepts to help him develop FORTRAN, the first widely used high-level computer programming language. Chomsky's theory of generative grammar has also influenced work in music theory and analysis.

Chomsky is among the most cited authors living or dead. He was cited within the Arts and Humanities Citation Index more often than any other living scholar from 1980 to 1992. Chomsky was also extensively cited in the Social Sciences Citation Index and Science Citation Index during the same period. The librarian who conducted the research said that the statistics show that "he is very widely read across disciplines and that his work is used by researchers across disciplines... it seems that you can't write a paper without citing Noam Chomsky." As a result of his influence, there are dueling camps of Chomskyan and non-Chomskyan linguistics, with the disputes between the two camps often acrimonious. Additionally, according to journalist Maya Jaggi, Chomsky is among the most quoted sources in the humanities, ranking alongside Marx, Shakespeare and the Bible.

In politics
Chomsky's status as the "most-quoted living author" is credited to his political writings, which vastly outnumber his writings on linguistics. Chomsky biographer Wolfgang B. Sperlich characterizes him as "one of the most notable contemporary champions of the people"; journalist John Pilger has described him as a "genuine people's hero; an inspiration for struggles all over the world for that basic decency known as freedom. To a lot of people in the margins—activists and movements—he's unfailingly supportive." Arundhati Roy has called him "one of the greatest, most radical public thinkers of our time", and Edward Said thought him "one of the most significant challengers of unjust power and delusions". Fred Halliday has said that by the start of the 21st century Chomsky had become a "guru" for the world's anti-capitalist and anti-imperialist movements. The propaganda model of media criticism that he and Herman developed has been widely accepted in radical media critiques and adopted to some level in mainstream criticism of the media, also exerting a significant influence on the growth of alternative media, including radio, publishers, and the Internet, which in turn have helped to disseminate his work.

Sperlich also says that Chomsky has been vilified by corporate interests, particularly in the mainstream press. University departments devoted to history and political science rarely include Chomsky's work on their undergraduate syllabi. Critics have argued that despite publishing widely on social and political issues, Chomsky has no formal expertise in these areas; he has responded that such issues are not as complex as many social scientists claim and that almost everyone is able to comprehend them regardless of whether they have been academically trained to do so. According to McGilvray, many of Chomsky's critics "do not bother quoting his work or quote out of context, distort, and create straw men that cannot be supported by Chomsky's text".

Chomsky drew criticism for not calling the Bosnian War's Srebrenica massacre a "genocide". While he did not deny the fact of the massacre, which he called "a horror story and major crime", he felt the massacre did not meet the definition of genocide.

Chomsky's far-reaching criticisms of U.S. foreign policy and the legitimacy of U.S. power have raised controversy. A document obtained pursuant to a Freedom of Information Act (FOIA) request from the U.S. government revealed that the Central Intelligence Agency (CIA) monitored his activities and for years denied doing so. The CIA also destroyed its files on Chomsky at some point, possibly in violation of federal law. He has often received undercover police protection at MIT and when speaking on the Middle East, but has refused uniformed police protection. German news magazine Der Spiegel described Chomsky as "the Ayatollah of anti-American hatred", while American conservative commentator David Horowitz called him "the most devious, the most dishonest and ... the most treacherous intellect in America", whose work is infused with "anti-American dementia" and evidences his "pathological hatred of his own country". Writing in Commentary magazine, the journalist Jonathan Kay described Chomsky as "a hard-boiled anti-American monomaniac who simply refuses to believe anything that any American leader says".

Chomsky's criticism of Israel has led to his being called a traitor to the Jewish people and an anti-Semite. Criticizing Chomsky's defense of the right of individuals to engage in Holocaust denial on the grounds that freedom of speech must be extended to all viewpoints, Werner Cohn called Chomsky "the most important patron" of the neo-Nazi movement. The Anti-Defamation League (ADL) called him a Holocaust denier, describing him as a "dupe of intellectual pride so overweening that he is incapable of making distinctions between totalitarian and democratic societies, between oppressors and victims". In turn, Chomsky has claimed that the ADL is dominated by "Stalinist types" who oppose democracy in Israel. The lawyer Alan Dershowitz has called Chomsky a "false prophet of the left"; Chomsky called Dershowitz "a complete liar" who is on "a crazed jihad, dedicating much of his life to trying to destroy my reputation". In early 2016, President Recep Tayyip Erdoğan of Turkey publicly rebuked Chomsky after he signed an open letter condemning Erdoğan for his anti-Kurdish repression and double standards on terrorism. Chomsky accused Erdoğan of hypocrisy, noting that Erdoğan supports al-Qaeda's Syrian affiliate, the al-Nusra Front.

Academic achievements, awards, and honors

In 1970, the London Times named Chomsky one of the "makers of the twentieth century". He was voted the world's leading public intellectual in The 2005 Global Intellectuals Poll jointly conducted by American magazine Foreign Policy and British magazine Prospect. New Statesman readers listed Chomsky among the world's foremost heroes in 2006.

In the United States he is a Member of the National Academy of Sciences, the American Academy of Arts and Sciences, the Linguistic Society of America, the American Association for the Advancement of Science, the American Philosophical Association, and the American Philosophical Society. Abroad he is a corresponding fellow of the British Academy, an honorary member of the British Psychological Society, a member of the Deutsche Akademie der Naturforscher Leopoldina, and a foreign member of the Department of Social Sciences of the Serbian Academy of Sciences and Arts. He received a 1971 Guggenheim Fellowship, the 1984 American Psychological Association Award for Distinguished Contributions to Psychology, the 1988 Kyoto Prize in Basic Sciences, the 1996 Helmholtz Medal, the 1999 Benjamin Franklin Medal in Computer and Cognitive Science, the 2010 Erich Fromm Prize, and the British Academy's 2014 Neil and Saras Smith Medal for Linguistics. He is also a two-time winner of the NCTE George Orwell Award for Distinguished Contribution to Honesty and Clarity in Public Language (1987 and 1989). He has also received the Rabindranath Tagore Centenary Award from The Asiatic Society.

Chomsky received the 2004 Carl-von-Ossietzky Prize from the city of Oldenburg, Germany, to acknowledge his body of work as a political analyst and media critic. He received an honorary fellowship in 2005 from the Literary and Historical Society of University College Dublin. He received the 2008 President's Medal from the Literary and Debating Society of the National University of Ireland, Galway. Since 2009, he has been an honorary member of International Association of Professional Translators and Interpreters (IAPTI). He received the University of Wisconsin's A.E. Havens Center's Award for Lifetime Contribution to Critical Scholarship and was inducted into IEEE Intelligent Systems' AI's Hall of Fame for "significant contributions to the field of AI and intelligent systems." Chomsky has an Erdős number of four.

In 2011, the US Peace Memorial Foundation awarded Chomsky the US Peace Prize for anti-war activities over five decades. For his work in human rights, peace, and social criticism, he received the 2011 Sydney Peace Prize, the Sretenje Order in 2015, the 2017 Seán MacBride Peace Prize and the Dorothy Eldridge Peacemaker Award.

Chomsky has received honorary doctorates from institutions including the University of London and the University of Chicago (1967), Loyola University Chicago and Swarthmore College (1970), Bard College (1971), Delhi University (1972), the University of Massachusetts (1973), and the International School for Advanced Studies in Trieste (2012) among others. His public lectures have included the 1969 John Locke Lectures, 1975 Whidden Lectures, 1977 Huizinga Lecture, and 1988 Massey Lectures, among others.

Various tributes to Chomsky have been dedicated over the years. He is the eponym for a bee species, a frog species, and a building complex at the Indian university Jamia Millia Islamia. Actor Viggo Mortensen and avant-garde guitarist Buckethead dedicated their 2003 album Pandemoniumfromamerica to Chomsky.

Selected bibliography

Linguistics
 Syntactic Structures (1957)
 Current Issues in Linguistic Theory (1964)
 Aspects of the Theory of Syntax (1965)
 Cartesian Linguistics (1965)
 Language and Mind (1968)
 The Sound Pattern of English with Morris Halle (1968)
 Reflections on Language (1975)
 Lectures on Government and Binding (1981)
 The Minimalist Program (1995)

Politics
 American Power and the New Mandarins (1969)
 For Reasons of State (1973)
 Counter-Revolutionary Violence: Bloodbaths in Fact & Propaganda with Edward S. Herman (1973)
 The Political Economy of Human Rights (1979)
 Towards a New Cold War (1982)
 The Fateful Triangle (1983)
 Pirates and Emperors (1986)
 Manufacturing Consent (1988)
 Necessary Illusions (1989)
 Deterring Democracy (1991)
 Letters from Lexington (1993)
 The Prosperous Few and the Restless Many (1993)
 World Orders Old and New (1994)
 Objectivity and Liberal Scholarship (1997)

 Profit over People (1999)
 9-11 (2001)
 Understanding Power (2002)
 Middle East Illusions (2003)
 Hegemony or Survival (2003)
 Getting Haiti Right This Time (2004)
 Imperial Ambitions (2005)
 Failed States: The Abuse of Power and the Assault on Democracy (2006)
 Interventions (2007)
 Gaza in Crisis (2010)
 Making the Future (2012)
 Occupy (2012)
 Requiem for the American Dream (2017)

See also

 American philosophy
 Theory of language
 Chomsky (surname)
 Knowledge worker
 List of linguists
 List of peace activists
 List of pioneers in computer science

Notes

References

Bibliography

 
 
 
 
 
 
 
 
 
 
 
 
 
 
 
 
 
 
 
 
 
 
 
 
 
 
 
  also available, in part, on chomsky.info .
 
 
 
 
 
 
 
 
 
 
 
 
 
 
 
 
 
 
 
 
 
 
 
 
 
 
 
 
 
 
 
 
 
 
 
 
 
 
 
 
 
 
 
 
 
 
 
 
 
 
 
 
 
 
 
 (facsimile copy of Lukes's THES article, together with some of the correspondence it provoked, including from Ralph Miliband, Ken Coates and others, with Chomsky's response)

Further reading

 
 
 
 
 
 
 
 
 
 
 
 
 
 
 
 
 
 
 
 
 
 
 
 
 
 
 
 
 
 
 
 
 
  a review of

External links

 
 Noam Chomsky personal archives at MIT
 Noam Chomsky Audio Conservatory at Internet Archive
 Faculty page at MIT
 Faculty page at University of Arizona
 
 

 
1928 births
20th-century American male writers
20th-century American non-fiction writers
20th-century American philosophers
20th-century essayists
20th-century linguists
21st-century American male writers
21st-century American non-fiction writers
21st-century American philosophers
21st-century essayists
21st-century linguists
American anarchists
American anti-capitalists
American anti–Iraq War activists
American anti–Vietnam War activists
American cognitive scientists
American ethicists
American male essayists
American male non-fiction writers
American media critics
American people of Belarusian-Jewish descent
American people of Ukrainian-Jewish descent
American philosophy academics
American political philosophers
American political writers
American social commentators
American socialists
American tax resisters
Analytic philosophers
Anarcho-syndicalists
Anti-consumerists
Anti-corporate activists
Anti-globalization activists
Anti-globalization writers
American anti-poverty advocates
Articles containing video clips
Central High School (Philadelphia) alumni
Columbia University faculty
Communication scholars
Corresponding Fellows of the British Academy
Critics of conspiracy theories
Critics of neoconservatism
Critics of postmodernism
Developmental psycholinguists
Environmental philosophers
Environmental writers
Epistemologists
Fellows of the Cognitive Science Society
Fellows of the Linguistic Society of America
Fellows of the Royal Society of Canada
Foreign members of the Serbian Academy of Sciences and Arts
Free speech activists
Freethought writers
Gratz College
Harvard Fellows
Linguists of Hebrew
History of economic thought
Industrial Workers of the World members
Institute for Advanced Study visiting scholars
Jewish American non-fiction writers
Jewish American writers
Jewish anarchists
Jewish anti-Zionism in the United States
Jewish ethicists
Jewish linguists
Jewish philosophers
Jewish socialists
Kyoto laureates in Basic Sciences
Libertarian socialists
Linguists from the United States
Linguists of English
Living people
Mass media theorists
Massachusetts socialists
Media critics
Members of the American Philosophical Society
Members of the German Academy of Sciences Leopoldina
Members of the Serbian Academy of Sciences and Arts
Members of the United States National Academy of Sciences
Metaphilosophers
Metaphysicians
Metaphysics writers
MIT School of Humanities, Arts, and Social Sciences faculty
New Left
Occupy movement in the United States
Ontologists
Palestinian solidarity activists
People from Allston–Brighton
People from Lexington, Massachusetts
Philosophers from Pennsylvania
Philosophers of culture
Philosophers of economics
Philosophers of education
Philosophers of history
Philosophers of language
Philosophers of linguistics
Philosophers of mind
Philosophers of psychology
Philosophers of science
Philosophers of social science
Philosophers of technology
Philosophy academics
Propaganda theorists
Rationalists
Recipients of the Neil and Saras Smith Medal for Linguistics
Signatories of the Declaration on the Common Language
Social philosophers
Sustainability advocates
Syntacticians
Theorists on Western civilization
University of Pennsylvania alumni
Writers about activism and social change
Writers about globalization
Writers from Philadelphia